Parks L. Bailey (died April 21, 1922) was an American football player and coach. He served as a player-coach at the University of Wisconsin–Stout (then known as Stout Normal School) from 1915 to 1916.

References

Year of birth unknown
1922 deaths
Player-coaches
Wisconsin–Stout Blue Devils football coaches
Wisconsin–Stout Blue Devils football players